Adam Powers, The Juggler (also known as The Juggler) is a 1981 computer animation created by Richard Taylor and Gary Demos and released by Information International Inc. (Triple I). It was one of the earliest CGI animated anthropomorphic characters ever. The character was motion captured from Ken Rosenthal, a real juggler.

Premise
The film opens with a juggler juggling a pack of shapes (circle, square, cones, etc.) and showing the computer animation film the shapes and objects around the scene.  As the version included in the DVDs and Blu-rays bonus material is taken straight from one of the company's demo reels, a Mercedes-Benz logo is seen inside the green ball, which was not in the original short film. The film ends with the juggler vanishing the scene.

References

External links
 

Computer animation